Brian Brown (born January 9, 1967) is an American male former track and field athlete who competed in the high jump. He was the national champion at the USA Outdoor Track and Field Championships in 1989 and won the NCAA Indoor Division I title in 1990.

He competed for the United States three times at world level, at the 1989 IAAF World Cup, 1997 IAAF World Indoor Championships and 1999 World Championships in Athletics. Brown was a bronze medalist at the 1998 Goodwill Games.

After his retirement from the sport he turned to coaching and organization, working at Drake University and the University of Missouri, alongside his wife Natasha Kaiser-Brown.

Career
Born in New Iberia, Louisiana, Brown attended New Iberia Senior High School and won the high school state championship in the high jump in 1982 and 1983. He went on to study at Northwestern State University in his home state and, with a frame standing  he was part of the Northwestern State Demons basketball and track teams. He competed in the high jump at NCAA level from 1987 to 1990. He was fifth outdoors in 1987 before taking third at the 1988 NCAA Indoors. He made his international debut in 1989, but failed to record a valid jump at the Universiade in Duisburg.

The 1989 season proved to be the peak of Brown's career. He was also chosen to represent his country at the 1989 IAAF World Cup, where he placed sixth. His performances declined after 1990. He managed fifth at the 1992 United States Olympic Trials, but otherwise failed to make the final at the outdoor national championships. A severe injury to the anterior cruciate ligament in his jumping leg in 1993 paused his career, through he underwent surgery which allowed him to compete again. After a two-year break from competition he returned to better form in 1996, ranking as the sixth best jumper in the nation and placing seventh at the 1996 United States Olympic Trials.

Brown made two world teams for the United States in 1997. He passed  in Notre Dame, Indiana in February and third place at the USA Indoor Track and Field Championships earned him selection for the 1997 IAAF World Indoor Championships (he was eliminated in the qualifying round there). He cleared 2.31 m again outdoors, this time in Des Moines, Iowa, and was again third place nationally, behind Charles Austin and Randy Jenkins at the 1997 USA Outdoor Track and Field Championships. His was selected for the 1997 World Championships in Athletics as a result, though again he would not progress to the World Championships high jump final. He ranked eleventh in the world on height that year.

One more successful year followed. In 1998 he was runner-up at the USA Indoors, then third at the 1998 USA Outdoor Track and Field Championships, tying with Hollis Conway. He represented the United States at the 1998 Goodwill Games and took the sole international medal of his career – a bronze – behind world record holder Javier Sotomayor and teammate Charles Austin.

He married fellow American track athlete Natasha Kaiser-Brown and the pair worked together as college athletic coach staff at Drake University. Brown was the organiser of the Drake Relays meet for eleven years before leaving in 2016 to be assistant athletic director at the University of Missouri. During his tenure as Drake Relays organiser, he attracted world class level track athletes to compete at the nominally college meet and raised funds through corporate sponsorship with Hy-Vee. Brown earned his masters and doctorate at Missouri, and his daughter Elle Brown attends the college and is a member of the basketball team.

International competitions

National titles
USA Outdoor Track and Field Championships
High jump: 1989

See also
List of high jump national champions (men)

References

External links

Living people
1967 births
People from New Iberia, Louisiana
Track and field athletes from Louisiana
American male high jumpers
World Athletics Championships athletes for the United States
Northwestern State Demons track and field athletes
African-American male track and field athletes
American track and field coaches
Drake Bulldogs track and field coaches
Missouri Tigers athletic directors
Goodwill Games medalists in athletics
Competitors at the 1998 Goodwill Games
21st-century African-American people
20th-century African-American sportspeople